Robbie Sims (born November 5, 1959) is an American former professional boxer who competed from 1980 to 1996. He is the half-brother of former world middleweight champion Marvelous Marvin Hagler.

Professional career
He KOd an inexperienced Iran Barkley, outpointed Doug DeWitt and rose to prominence as a middleweight contender by a very polemical defeating Roberto Durán in 1986.  
Sims lost to Sumbu Kalambay in a shot for the WBA title in 1988 and it was all downhill from there. All his losses were on points except a KO7 vs Nigel Benn.

Sims was trained by famous Brockton based trainers Pat and Goody Petronelli. He had a career record of 38-10-2 with 26 knockouts.

Professional boxing record

|-
|align="center" colspan=8|38 Wins (26 knockouts, 12 decisions), 10 Losses (1 knockout, 9 decisions), 2 Draws 
|-
| align="center" style="border-style: none none solid solid; background: #e3e3e3"|Result
| align="center" style="border-style: none none solid solid; background: #e3e3e3"|Record
| align="center" style="border-style: none none solid solid; background: #e3e3e3"|Opponent
| align="center" style="border-style: none none solid solid; background: #e3e3e3"|Type
| align="center" style="border-style: none none solid solid; background: #e3e3e3"|Round
| align="center" style="border-style: none none solid solid; background: #e3e3e3"|Date
| align="center" style="border-style: none none solid solid; background: #e3e3e3"|Location
| align="center" style="border-style: none none solid solid; background: #e3e3e3"|Notes
|-
|Win
|
|align=left| Jose Burgos
|PTS
|8
|20/09/1996
|align=left| Bayside Expo Center, Boston, Massachusetts, U.S.
|align=left|
|-
|Loss
|
|align=left| Vinny Pazienza
|UD
|10
|26/10/1993
|align=left| Mashantucket, Connecticut, U.S.
|align=left|
|-
|Win
|
|align=left| Willis Ely
|KO
|3
|16/04/1993
|align=left| Boston, Massachusetts, U.S.
|align=left|
|-
|Win
|
|align=left| Keheven Johnson
|TKO
|3
|26/02/1993
|align=left| Woodbridge, Virginia, U.S.
|align=left|
|-
|Win
|
|align=left| Jerry Strickland
|KO
|1
|26/06/1992
|align=left| Randolph, Massachusetts, U.S.
|align=left|
|-
|Win
|
|align=left| Dennis Johnson
|KO
|4
|02/04/1992
|align=left| Randolph, Massachusetts, U.S.
|align=left|
|-
|Win
|
|align=left| Robert Curry
|PTS
|10
|22/02/1992
|align=left| Randolph, Massachusetts, U.S.
|align=left|
|-
|Loss
|
|align=left| Nigel Benn
|KO
|7
|03/04/1991
|align=left| London, England
|align=left|
|-
|Win
|
|align=left| Ralph Moncrief
|UD
|10
|24/11/1990
|align=left| Boston, Massachusetts, U.S.
|align=left|
|-
|Loss
|
|align=left| Ron Essett
|MD
|10
|26/06/1990
|align=left| Tampa, Florida, U.S.
|align=left|
|-
|Win
|
|align=left| Kenny Butler
|DQ
|5
|13/04/1990
|align=left| Taunton, Massachusetts, U.S.
|align=left|
|-
|Win
|
|align=left| Victor King
|TKO
|9
|30/12/1989
|align=left| Boston, Massachusetts, U.S.
|align=left|
|-
|Loss
|
|align=left| Dennis Milton
|UD
|10
|12/09/1989
|align=left| Atlantic City, New Jersey, U.S.
|align=left|
|-
|Loss
|
|align=left| Doug DeWitt
|SD
|12
|18/04/1989
|align=left| Atlantic City, New Jersey, U.S.
|align=left|
|-
|Loss
|
|align=left| Sumbu Kalambay
|UD
|12
|12/06/1988
|align=left| Ravenna, Italy
|align=left|
|-
|Win
|
|align=left| Ralph Smiley
|TKO
|9
|18/03/1988
|align=left| Boston, Massachusetts, U.S.
|align=left|
|-
|Win
|
|align=left| Lee Sanders
|TKO
|5
|10/04/1987
|align=left| Las Vegas, Nevada, U.S.
|align=left|
|-
|Draw
|
|align=left| Tim Williams
|PTS
|10
|12/02/1987
|align=left| Las Vegas, Nevada, U.S.
|align=left|
|-
|Win
|
|align=left| Roberto Durán
|SD
|10
|23/06/1986
|align=left| Las Vegas, Nevada, U.S.
|align=left|
|-
|Win
|
|align=left| John Collins
|TKO
|1
|09/03/1986
|align=left| Las Vegas, Nevada, U.S.
|align=left|
|-
|Win
|
|align=left| Mario Tineo
|TKO
|4
|06/12/1985
|align=left| Las Vegas, Nevada, U.S.
|align=left|
|-
|Win
|
|align=left| Doug DeWitt
|UD
|10
|30/08/1985
|align=left| Atlantic City, New Jersey, U.S.
|align=left|
|-
|Win
|
|align=left| Stacy McSwain
|KO
|4
|30/05/1985
|align=left| Portland, Maine, U.S.
|align=left|
|-
|Loss
|
|align=left| Mike Tinley
|UD
|10
|01/11/1984
|align=left| Atlantic City, New Jersey, U.S.
|align=left|
|-
|Win
|
|align=left| Mike Baker
|TKO
|5
|26/07/1984
|align=left| Miami Beach, Florida, U.S.
|align=left|
|-
|Win
|
|align=left| Danny Long
|SD
|12
|10/05/1984
|align=left| Brockton, Massachusetts, U.S.
|align=left|
|-
|Win
|
|align=left| Curtis Ramsey
|UD
|10
|29/03/1984
|align=left| Las Vegas, Nevada, U.S.
|align=left|
|-
|Win
|
|align=left| Iran Barkley
|KO
|6
|06/01/1984
|align=left| Atlantic City, New Jersey, U.S.
|align=left|
|-
|Win
|
|align=left| Charlie Hecker
|KO
|2
|25/10/1983
|align=left| Portland, Maine, U.S.
|align=left|
|-
|Win
|
|align=left| Teddy Mann
|SD
|10
|01/09/1983
|align=left| Atlantic City, New Jersey, U.S.
|align=left|
|-
|Loss
|
|align=left| Mike Tinley
|SD
|10
|03/08/1983
|align=left| Atlantic City, New Jersey, U.S.
|align=left|
|-
|Win
|
|align=left| Tony Chiaverini
|KO
|5
|23/03/1983
|align=left| Worcester, Massachusetts, U.S.
|align=left|
|-
|Draw
|
|align=left| Murray Sutherland
|PTS
|10
|04/02/1983
|align=left| Worcester, Massachusetts, U.S.
|align=left|
|-
|Loss
|
|align=left| Clinton Jackson
|PTS
|10
|16/10/1982
|align=left| Atlantic City, New Jersey, U.S.
|align=left|
|-
|Win
|
|align=left| Bruce Thompson
|KO
|1
|20/08/1982
|align=left| Plymouth, Massachusetts, U.S.
|align=left|
|-
|Win
|
|align=left| Jose Green
|KO
|4
|10/07/1982
|align=left| McAfee, New Jersey, U.S.
|align=left|
|-
|Win
|
|align=left| Fred Reed
|TKO
|5
|30/04/1982
|align=left| South Yarmouth, Massachusetts, U.S.
|align=left|
|-
|Loss
|
|align=left| Bobby Czyz
|UD
|10
|17/01/1982
|align=left| Atlantic City, New Jersey, U.S.
|align=left|
|-
|Win
|
|align=left| Johnny Heard
|UD
|10
|23/12/1981
|align=left| Providence, Rhode Island, U.S.
|align=left|
|-
|Win
|
|align=left| O'Dell Leonard
|KO
|5
|16/09/1981
|align=left| Boston, Massachusetts, U.S.
|align=left|
|-
|Win
|
|align=left| Jesus Castro
|TKO
|3
|06/08/1981
|align=left| Atlantic City, New Jersey, U.S.
|align=left|
|-
|Win
|
|align=left| Dom DiMarzo
|TKO
|2
|13/06/1981
|align=left| Boston, Massachusetts, U.S.
|align=left|
|-
|Win
|
|align=left| James Green
|PTS
|8
|12/04/1981
|align=left| Atlantic City, New Jersey, U.S.
|align=left|
|-
|Win
|
|align=left| Jamal Arbubakar
|PTS
|8
|06/03/1981
|align=left| Worcester, Massachusetts, U.S.
|align=left|
|-
|Win
|
|align=left| Lenny Villers
|KO
|5
|12/02/1981
|align=left| Boston, Massachusetts, U.S.
|align=left|
|-
|Win
|
|align=left| Bill Harrington
|KO
|2
|17/01/1981
|align=left| Boston, Massachusetts, U.S.
|align=left|
|-
|Win
|
|align=left| Robert Thomas
|KO
|4
|25/11/1980
|align=left| Boston, Massachusetts, U.S.
|align=left|
|-
|Win
|
|align=left| Danny Heath
|KO
|1
|02/10/1980
|align=left| Boston, Massachusetts, U.S.
|align=left|
|-
|Win
|
|align=left| David Dean
|KO
|1
|18/08/1980
|align=left| Boston, Massachusetts, U.S.
|align=left|
|-
|Win
|
|align=left| Troy Vaughn
|KO
|3
|17/05/1980
|align=left| Las Vegas, Nevada, U.S.
|align=left|
|}

References

External links
 

Living people
1959 births
American male boxers
Middleweight boxers
Boxers from Massachusetts
Sportspeople from Brockton, Massachusetts